

This is a list of the National Register of Historic Places listings in Davenport, Iowa.  This is intended to be a complete list of the properties and districts on the National Register of Historic Places in Davenport, Iowa, United States. Latitude and longitude coordinates are provided for many National Register properties and districts; these locations may be seen together in an online map.

There are 286 properties and districts listed on the National Register in Scott County, including 1 National Historic Landmarks. The city of Davenport is the location of 254 of these properties and districts; they are listed in the three lists linked in the section below, while the remaining 32 properties and districts, including the National Historic Landmark, are listed separately. One district, the Vander Veer Park Historic District, is split between east and west Davenport.

Number of listings by region
The properties are distributed across all parts of Davenport. For the purposes of this list, the city is split into three regions: East Davenport, which includes all of the city east of Brady Street (U.S. Route 61) and north of 5th Street; Downtown Davenport, which includes all of the city south of 5th Street from Marquette Street east to the intersection of River Drive (U.S. Route 67) and 4th Street; and West Davenport, which includes all of the city west of Marquette Street and between Marquette and Brady Street (U.S. Route 61) north of 5th Street.

See also 
 List of National Historic Landmarks in Iowa
 National Register of Historic Places listings in Iowa

References

 
Davenport, Iowa
Davenport